The Newcastle & North Shields Railway opened in June 1839 from a temporary terminus in Carliol Square in Newcastle upon Tyne to North Shields. The railway was absorbed by the Newcastle & Berwick Railway in November 1844. The Newcastle & Berwick Railway was itself absorbed by the York, Newcastle and Berwick Railway, and this became part of the North Eastern Railway in 1854.

Tynemouth was served from 1847 and Newcastle Central replaced the original station in 1850. In 1882 the station at Tynemouth was replaced by a through station when the line and the former Blyth and Tyne Railway line were linked. The route was electrified in 1904 as part of the Tyneside Electrics programme.

Origins
A railway between Newcastle and North Shields was proposed in 1830, but was opposed in Newcastle by people who feared that the city docks would lose trade to the docks in North Shields, and by people in North Shields who feared local shops would lose trade when customers could travel to Newcastle and that no-one would holiday in North Shields if they could stay in Newcastle. Of the two  proposed routes one was chosen in 1835, changed the following year so Tynemouth was on the main line rather than served by a branch. To compensate landowners for the lost income from wayleaves on coal carried on the existing wagonways, a toll of d a mile was agreed. The Newcastle and North Shields Railway (N&NSR) received Royal Assent on 21 June 1836.

After leaving the temporary terminus at Newcastle the railway passed through a short tunnel before crossing two viaducts built using laminated timber arches on masonry piers, similar to the Wiebeking system used on the Seine at Pont d'Ivry in Paris. The railway opened on 18 June 1839 when two trains carried a total of 700 passengers on a return trip to a celebration in Tynemouth, which was interrupted by a violent thunderstorm that flooded the marquee. Public services started the next day, although Tynemouth was not served until 1847.

First-class carriages were painted crimson, maroon, and in one case a rich light scarlet claret edged with yellow and those for second-class passengers were light brown and vermilion.

Locomotives

Locomotive list

Notes
 NNSR = Newcastle & North Shields Railway
 NER = North Eastern Railway

Legacy

The Newcastle & Berwick Railway was absorbed by the York, Newcastle & Berwick Railway, and this became part of the North Eastern Railway in 1854. The temporary terminus in Newcastle was replaced by Newcastle Central station in 1850. A  loop via Walker, known as the Riverside Branch, was opened in 1879 and a through station (now Tynemouth Metro station) replaced the original N&NSR terminus, linking with the Blyth & Tyne Railway, in 1882. The line was electrified as part of the Tyneside Electrics programme, the new trains running in passenger service from 1904.

The line today

Services were withdrawn from the Riverside branch on 23 July 1973 and it now has been converted into a footpath and cycle-path known as Hadrian's Way, forming part of both the C2C cycle route (National Cycle Network route 72) and the Hadrian's Wall National Trail.

In 1982 almost all of the main route (from a point just east of Heaton to Tynemouth and beyond) was converted to form part of the Tyne and Wear Metro Yellow line.

Notes and references

Footnotes

References

Sources

Further reading

External links

 

Railway companies established in 1836
Railway lines opened in 1839
Railway companies disestablished in 1844
1836 establishments in England
North Shields